Telphusa pistaciae, the pistachio bud moth, is a moth of the family Gelechiidae. It is found in Iran.

The larvae feed on the blossoms of Pistacia vera.

References

Moths described in 1982
Telphusa